St Anne's Church, Over Haddon is a Grade II listed parish church in the Church of England in Over Haddon, Derbyshire.

History
The church was built between 1879 and 1880 by the architect H Cockbain of Middleton, Greater Manchester. The foundation stone was laid by Miss M. Nesfield, daughter of R.W.M. Nesfield of Castle Hill, Bakewell on 26 June 1879 The contractors were Messrs. J.R. and A. Hill of Tideswell and Litton. It was constructed in Ricklow Dale stone, with windows, doors and arches of wrought freestone from Sheldon Moor. Maw's tiles were laid in the nave, aisle and porch. The chancel and baptistry floors were paved in polished marble Mosaic, the steps being of Bardilla. The bell was case by Mears and Stainbank, the benches by J. Heywood of Manchester, and the stone carving by Mr. Ash of Buxton. The wrought iron entrance gates were made by Messrs Thomason of Birmingham and Manchester. The church was consecrated by the Bishop of Lichfield on 26 July 1880.

Parish status
The church is in a joint parish with:
All Saints’ Church, Bakewell
Holy Trinity Church, Ashford-in-the-Water
St Katherine's Church, Rowsley
St Michael and All Angels' Church, Sheldon

Organ
An organ was installed in 1988 by the Johnson Organ Company A specification of the organ can be found on the National Pipe Organ Register.

See also
Listed buildings in Over Haddon

References

Over Haddon
Over Haddon
Churches completed in 1880